St Petersburg-Vitebsky is a railway station terminal in Saint Petersburg, Russia. Formerly known as St Petersburg-Tsarskoselsky station because its first line led to the suburban royal residences town of Tsarskoye Selo, it was the first railway station to be built in Saint Petersburg and the whole of the Russian Empire (while its present-day building is much newer). Later, with considerable extension of its lines, the station was renamed after a much farther destination - Vitebsk, a city in Belarus.

Early history 

The station, located at the crossing of the Zagorodny Avenue and the now-vanished Vvedensky Canal, was inaugurated in the presence of Nicholas I of Russia on 30 October 1837 when the first Russian train, named Provorny, departed from its platform for the imperial residence at Tsarskoe Selo. A replica of this train may be seen as a permanent exhibit at the modern station.

The first building of the Petersburg Station (as it was then known) was constructed in timber in August and September of the same year to a design by Konstantin Thon. Since it proved to be too small, it was demolished within twelve years and a much larger structure was erected under Thon's supervision between 1849 and 1852. There were further expansions in the 1870s.

Architecture 
The station became increasingly ramshackle and cluttered as the 19th century went on, until the decision was taken to tear the whole building down and begin again. Construction started in 1901 and lasted for three years. Stanislaw Brzozowski gave the new two-storey station an ornate frontage in an assortment of historical styles, with decorative reliefs, floriated Jugendstil detailing, outsize semicircular windows and two regular features of 19th-century train stations: a pseudo-Renaissance dome and a square clocktower.

However, it was  opulent Art Nouveau interior that established the building as the most ornate of St Petersburg stations. Minash was responsible for the sweeping staircases, foyer with stained glass and spacious halls boasting a series of painted panels that chronicle the history of Russia's first railway. The building's soaring arches and expanses of glass proclaimed the architect's familiarity with advanced construction techniques of the West.

Vitebsky railway station, unlike other railway terminals, does not have a station square in front of it – its main facade looks out onto the Zagorodny Prospect.1

Recent history 

In a departure from normal practice of the Soviet years, the Vitebsk station preserved its elevated train shed, five platforms and luggage elevators almost intact, making it an ideal location for filming Soviet adaptations of Anna Karenina, Sherlock Holmes stories, and other 19th-century classics.

On the other hand, much architectural detail was removed from the facade and halls during insensitive Soviet renovations. Just prior to the tercentenary celebrations of 2003, the station underwent a painstaking restoration of its original interior and Jugendstil decor. Apart from the replica of the first Russian train, curiosities of the Vitebsk Station include a detached pavilion for the Tsar and his family and a marble bust of Nicholas I.

Services from the station run to Central Europe, the Baltic States, Ukraine, Belarus and the southern suburbs of St Petersburg, such as Pushkin and Pavlovsk. The station is connected to the Pushkinskaya Station of the Saint Petersburg Metro.

See also
 Former Emperor's railway station in Pushkin town
Tsarskoye Selo
Pushkin, Saint Petersburg
 Tsarskoye Selo Railway

Sources 

 Богданов И.А. Витебский вокзал и Царскосельская железная дорога. // Новый журнал. 2002. No. 2. Pages 157-192.

External links 

 Views of the Vitebsk Station: exterior
 Views of the Vitebsk Station: interior

Railway stations in Saint Petersburg
Railway stations in the Russian Empire opened in 1837
Art Nouveau architecture in Saint Petersburg
Art Nouveau railway stations
Transport infrastructure completed in 1904
Towers in Saint Petersburg
Clock towers in Russia
Cultural heritage monuments of federal significance in Saint Petersburg